Devdutt Pattanaik is a mythologist from Mumbai, India. He is also a speaker, illustrator and author, on Hindu sacred lore, legends, folklore, fables and parables. His work focuses largely on the areas of religion, mythology, and management. He has written books on the relevance of sacred stories, symbols and rituals in modern times; his more popular books include Myth = Mithya: A Handbook of Hindu Mythology Jaya: An Illustrated Retelling of the Mahabharata and Sita: An Illustrated Retelling of the Ramayana and My Gita. Pattanaik has incorporated the Mahabharata and the Ramayana into human resource management.

Pattanaik is a columnist for Mid-Day, Times of India, CN Traveller, Daily O, and Scroll.in. He hosts a radio show/podcast for Radio Mirchi, called The Devdutt Pattanaik Show.

Early life and education
Pattanaik was born brought up in Mumbai. He spent his childhood and student life in Chembur, Mumbai. He studied in Our Lady of Perpetual Succour High School in Chembur. Pattanaik graduated in medicine (M.B.B.S.) from Grant Medical College, Mumbai, and subsequently obtained a diploma in Comparative Mythology from Mumbai University.

Career
Pattanaik worked in the pharmaceutical and healthcare industry (Sanofi Aventis and Apollo Group of Hospitals, respectively) for 14 years and spent his spare time writing articles and books on mythology, which eventually became his full-time profession.  His first book Shiva: An Introduction was published in 1997. Pattanaik illustrates most of his own books.

He has worked as a consultant at Ernst and Young. He also served as the Chief Belief Officer at Future Group, one of India's largest retailers.

He was a speaker at the first TED conference in India held in November 2009.

Pattanaik has consulted Star TV network on mythological television series like Mahabharata and Siya Ke Ram; these serials have challenged conventional views of the narratives and opened up new avenues of interpretation.

He has also been the story consultant at Indian television network Star TV, where Devon Ke Dev...Mahadev is based on his work and Epic channel, where he presents Devlok with Devdutt Pattanaik.

In 2015, Pattanaik presented the Hindi television series Devlok with Devdutt Pattanaik on the "EPIC ON" channel. In the show, he attempts to demystify and decode the folklore and traditions that accompanies Indian mythology. In December 2016, he made "his debut on the Forbes India Celeb 100 list, on the 93rd spot."

Pattanaik worked on Audible Originals (India)'s audiobook titled Suno Mahabharat Devdutt Pattanaik ke Saath and Revisiting Mahabharata with Devdutt Pattanaik. In his show he talks about the details of the war in the Mahabharata, how it affected the world, and what happened to India after the death of the Pandavas and the Kauravas. He also communicates the Vedic tenets which describes karma and dharma.

Art 

Columnist Koral Dasgupta mentions, "Pattanaik’s art follows a particular style and is dependent on expertly sketched lines but the focus is never the perfection of hands and limbs and props. The pursuit is clearly that of beauty and depiction; not the grammatical detailing of a photograph!"

Views

Myth and Mythology 

Pattanaik opines that "no society can exist without myth as it creates notions of right and wrong, good and bad, heaven and hell, rights and duties". To him, mythology "tells people how they should see the world... Different people will have their own mythology, reframing old ones or creating new ones." His desire is "to get Saraswati out of the closet. Saraswati belongs everywhere, she has to flow everywhere" and his body of work is aimed "to make knowledge accessible."

In Shiva to Shankara: Giving Form to the Formless, Pattanaik explores the layers of meanings embedded in Shiva's linga and the transformation of Shiva, the hermit, into Shankara, the householder by the Goddess. Culture: 50 Insights from Mythology contextualises mythology and proposes that myths are alive, dynamic, shaped by perception and the times one lives in.

Business 
In his book, Business Sutra: An Indian Approach to Management, "the central theme … is that when individual beliefs come into conflict with corporate beliefs, problems surface in organisations. Conversely, when institutional beliefs and individual beliefs are congruent, harmony is the resultant corporate climate. It is when people are seen as mere resources meant to be managed [read: manipulated] through compensation and so-called motivation; it is when they are treated like switches in a circuit board; it is then that disharmony descends causing disruption".

Politics 
Pattanaik is wary of the influence of "white saviours" on liberals as well as religious radicals. He has been rather contemptuous of the hyper-nationalism of a section of American Hindus who are clueless about Indian realities. He also frowns on secularists and atheists who deny their own missionary zeal and mythic structure, and see themselves as "rational".

Sexuality 
Pattanaik has been frank about the LGBTQ revolution in India. Pattnaik realised that he was gay in 10th standard and came out to his parents when he was 30. After the 2018 decriminalization of homosexuality in India, Pattanaik came out as gay in a televised interview. He has written about the presence, and at several instances, the celebration, of the queer within the Indian mythos. Elucidating that karmic faiths can be used to affirm the dignity of queer people, he speaks of how when one discovers love and appreciation for the world as it is, not the way one wants it to be, one develops wisdom.

Reception

In 2014, Pattanaik was listed in the top category of bestselling Indian authors. His book Devlok, based on the television programme of the same name, was one of the year's bestsellers in 2016. Forbes India had ranked Pattanaik among the 100 celebrities of India in 2016.

Fiction author Ashwin Sanghi has said that Pattanaik attempts to "explain mythology in simple words". Psychologist Urmi Chanda-Vaz, who calls Pattanaik "India's most beloved mythology explicator", praised his book My Gita. Intellectual Shiv Visvanathan has praised Pattanaik by saying that he has made myth-reading "an open, playful, almost domestic game, like Chinese Checkers or Scrabble".

Neil Gaiman praised Devdutt Pattanaik for his 2016 book Olympus: An Indian Retelling of the Greek Myth. "I read a fantastic Indian writer recently where he told Greek myth but from an Indian perspective... He makes it so easy to understand but what is lovely is that he does from a very proud Indian connect."

Pattanaik coined the phrase "Bharat Tyagi" to depict "a small group of PIOs, Queen Victoria’s frozen-in-time children, (who) imagine they must save India from Indians".

Publications

Mythology 
 Shiva: An Introduction. Vakils, Feffer and Simons Ltd., 1997. . (Based on Shiva).
 Vishnu: An Introduction. Vakils, Feffer and Simons Ltd., 1999. . (Based on Vishnu).
 Devi, The Mother-Goddess: An Introduction. Vakils, Feffer, and Simons Ltd., 2000. . (Based on the concept of Devi).
 The Goddess in India: The Five Faces of the Eternal Feminine. Inner Traditions/ Bear & Company, 2000. . Translations: Hindi.
 Hanuman: An Introduction. Vakils, Feffer and Simons Ltd., 2001. . (Based on Hanuman).
 The Man Who Was A Woman and Other Queer Tales from Hindu Lore. Harrington Park Press, 2002. .
 Hindu India. Brijbasi Art Press, 2003. . 
 Indian Mythology: Tales, Symbols, and Rituals from the Heart of the Subcontinent. Inner Traditions/ Bear & Company, 2003. .
 Lakshmi, The Goddess of Wealth and Fortune: An Introduction. Vakils, Feffer, and Simons Ltd., 2003. . (Based on Lakshmi). 
 Myth=Mithya: A Handbook of Hindu Mythology. Penguin Books India, 2006. . Translations: Hindi, Marathi, Turkish. 
 Shiva to Shankara: Decoding the Phallic Symbol. Indus Source, India. 2006. . Translations: Czech, Hindi (Based on Shiva).
 The Book of Ram. Penguin Books India, 2009. . (Based on Ram)  - Part of a book series on mythological figures published by Penguin.
 7 Secrets from Hindu Calendar Art. Westland Ltd., 2009. . Translations: Gujarati, Hindi (Based on Hindu Calendar art).
 Hanuman's Ramayan. Tulika Publishers, 2010. . (Based on Hanuman).
 Jaya: An Illustrated Retelling of the Mahabharata. Penguin Books India, 2010. . Translations: Hindi, Kannada, Malayalam, Marathi, Tamil (Based on the Mahabharata). 
 7 Secrets of Shiva. Westland Ltd., 2011. . Translations: Gujarati, Hindi, Kannada, Marathi, Russian, Telugu (Based on Shiva).
 7 Secrets of Vishnu. Westland Ltd., 2011. . Translations: Hindi, Kannada, Marathi, Russian (Based on Vishnu).
 99 Thoughts on Ganesha: Stories, Symbols and Rituals of India's Beloved Elephant-headed Deity. Jaico Publishing House, 2011. . Translations: Gujarati, Hindi, Malayalam, Marathi, Telugu (Based on Ganesha).
 Sita: An Illustrated Retelling of the Ramayana. Penguin Books India, 2013 . Translations: Hindi, Marathi, Tamil (Based on the Ramayana). 
 Shikhandi: And Other Tales They Don't Tell You. Zubaan Books & Penguin Books India, 2014. . Translations: Hindi, Marathi.
 7 Secrets of the Goddess. Westland Ltd., 2014. . Translations: Hindi, Italian, Marathi, Russian (Based on the Goddess).
 My Gita. Rupa Publications India, 2015. . Translations: Hindi, Marathi (Based on The Gita).
 Devlok with Devdutt Pattanaik. Penguin Random House India, 2016. .
 Olympus – An Indian Retelling of Greek Mythology. Penguin Random House India, 2016.  (Based on Greek mythology).
 Devlok with Devdutt Pattanaik (Book 2) – Publisher: Penguin Random House, 2017  Translations: Hindi 
 Shiva to Shankara: Giving Form to the Formless. HarperCollins India, Indus Source 2017. . – Based on Older Book / Reprint
 My Hanuman Chalisa. Rupa Publications, 2017.  (Based in the Hanuman Chalisa).
 Devlok with Devdutt Pattanaik (Book 3) – Publisher: Penguin Random House, 2017 .
 Shyam: An Illustrated Retelling of the Bhagavata. Penguin, 2018  (Based on the Bhagavata).
 Ramayana Versus Mahabharata: My Playful Comparison. Rupa Publications India, 2018  (Based on the Ramayana & Mahabharata).
 Hindu Trinity: 21 Life-enhancing Secrets Revealed Through Stories and Art. Westland India 2019. . – Based on Older Books / Reprint
 Wisdom of the Gods for You and Me: My Gita and My Hanuman Chalisa. Rupa Publications India 2019. . – Based on Older Books / Reprint
 Faith: 40 Insights into Hinduism – Publisher: HarperCollins, 2019 .
 Pilgrim Nation: The Making of Bharatvarsh - Aleph Book Company, 2020 .
 Dharma Artha Kama Moksha: 40 Insights into Happiness - HarperCollins, India, 2021 .
 Marriage: 100 Stories Around India's Favourite Ritual - Rupa Publications India, 2021 .
 Adi Purana: Entire Veda as a Single Story - Westland, 2021  - quick read
 Hope: Wisdom to Survive in a Hopeless World - Juggernaut, 2021 .
 Eden: An Indian Exploration of Jewish, Christian and Islamic Lore - Penguin Random House, 2021 .
 The Stories We Tell: Mythology to Make Sense of Modern Lives - Aleph Book Company, 2022 .
 Dharm Aur Samlaingikta/धर्म और समलैंगिकता - Penguin India, 2022 .
 Garuda Purana and Other Hindu Ideas On Death, Rebirth and Immortality - Westland Books, 2022 .

Management 
 Business Sutra: A Very Indian Approach to Management. Aleph Book Company, 2013. . Translations: French, German, Hindi, Italian, Marathi, Tamil.
 The Success Sutra: An Indian Approach to Wealth. Aleph Book Company, 2015. . – Based on Older Book
 The Leadership Sutra: An Indian Approach to Power. Aleph Book Company, 2016. . – Based on Older Book
 The Talent Sutra: An Indian Approach to Learning. Aleph Book Company, 2016,  – Based on Older Book
 Culture: 50 Insights from Mythology. HarperCollins India, Indus Source 2017. .
 Leader: 50 Insights from Mythology. HarperCollins India, Indus Source 2017. .
 How to Become Rich: 12 Lessons I Learnt from Vedic and Puranic Stories – Publisher: Rupa Publications India, 2019 .

Fiction 
 The Pregnant King. Penguin Books India, 2008. . Translations: Hindi, Marathi
 Is He Fresh?: Aka Kaula Hai? (Penguin Petit). Penguin UK, 2015.

Children's Books 
 Fun in Devlok: An Identity Card for Krishna. Puffin India, 2011. .
 Fun in Devlok: Gauri and the Talking Cow. Puffin India, 2011. .
 Fun in Devlok: Indra Finds Happiness. Puffin India, 2011. .
 Fun in Devlok: Kama vs Yama. Puffin India, 2011. .
 Fun in Devlok: Saraswati's Secret River. Puffin India, 2011. .
 Fun in Devlok: Shiva Plays Dumb Charades. Puffin India, 2011. .
 Fun in Devlok Omnibus. Puffin India, 2014. . – Reprint (Compilation)
 Pashu: Animal Tales from Hindu Mythology. Penguin Books India, 2014. . Translations: Hindi.
 The Girl Who Chose: A New Way of Narrating the Ramayana. Puffin Books, 2016.  (Based on the Ramayana).
 The Jaya Colouring Book. Penguin Random House India, 2016. . – Based on Older Book
 The Sita Colouring Book. Penguin Random House India, 2016. . – Based on Older Book
 The Boys Who Fought: The Mahabharata for Children. Puffin, 2017  (Based on the Mahabharata).
 Vahana: Gods and Their Favourite Animals - Rupa Publications India, 2020 .
 Shyam: Our Little Krishna - Puffin, 2021 . - Based on Older Book

Textbook
 Indian Culture, Art and Heritage For Civil Services Exam – Publisher:  Pearson India, 2021 (1st Edition) .

Foreword/Contribution
 Close, Too Close: The Tranquebar Book of Queer Erotica. Westland, 2012.   
 Celebrating Public Spaces of India.  Mapin Publishing, 2016. .
 The Illustrated Mahabharata: The Definitive Guide to India’s Greatest Epic. DK Publishing (Dorling Kindersley), 2017.  
 I Am Divine. So Are You: How Buddhism, Jainism, Sikhism and Hinduism Affirm the Dignity of Queer Identities and Sexualities. HarperCollins, 2017 .
 Padmavat: An Epic Love Story. Rupa Publications, 2018. . -Illustrator
 Behold, I Make All Things New: How Judaism, Christianity and Islam affirm the dignity of queer identities and sexualities. HarperCollins, 2019 .
 Kabir, Kabir: The life and work of the early modern poet-philosopher. Westland, 2021 . -Illustrator
 Urban Sadhu Yoga™ Chant Book: A Collection of Chants, Kirtans, Prayers, Sutras, Shlokas, Shastras, Devotional Songs, and Inspirational Texts for the Modern Yoga Practitioner.  -Illustrator

Co-authored
 Yoga Mythology: 64 Asanas and Their Stories – Publisher: HarperCollins, 2019 .
 Aranyaka: Book of the Forest – Publisher: Westland, 2019 .

References

External links

 
 
Devlok with Devdutt Pattanaik at EPIC ON

1970 births
Living people
Indian male writers
20th-century Indian medical doctors
Mythographers
Medical doctors from Mumbai
University of Mumbai alumni
Indian television presenters
Indian columnists
Indian LGBT writers
21st-century LGBT people